Josefa M. Saniel (b. Manila, March 23, 1925) is a Filipino scholar in the field of Filipino and Japanese history.

Academic career
Saniel got her bachelor's degree of Science in Education at the University of the Philippines in 1949, her master's degree in history from the University of Chicago in 1953 and her Ph.D. in Far Eastern Studies from the University of Michigan in 1962.

Works
Japan and the Philippines, 1868-1898 (1963)
Okuma Shigenobu and the Philippine 1898 Problem (1965)
Japan and the Philippines: From Traditional to Modern Societies (1976)

External links
Professional CV from University of the Philippines

Filipino women historians
Living people
1925 births
University of the Philippines alumni
University of Chicago alumni
University of Michigan alumni
Filipino expatriates in the United States
20th-century Filipino historians